The first season of the American television drama series Better Call Saul premiered on February 8, 2015, and concluded on April 6, 2015. The ten-episode season was broadcast on Monday nights in the United States on AMC, excluding the first episode which aired on a Sunday. A spin-off of Breaking Bad, Better Call Saul was created by Vince Gilligan and Peter Gould, both of whom also worked on Breaking Bad.

The season takes place in 2002, six years prior to the events in Breaking Bad, and features Bob Odenkirk reprising his role as James Morgan "Jimmy" McGill, known in Breaking Bad as Saul Goodman. Jimmy is a struggling lawyer looking after his successful brother Chuck, a former attorney. Jonathan Banks also reprises his role as Mike Ehrmantraut, a parking lot attendant who is also a criminal. 

The series premiere, "Uno" became the biggest in cable history at the time, drawing in 4.4 million and 4 million in the 18–49 and 25–54 demographics, respectively, and received an overall viewership of 6.88 million. The first season of Better Call Saul received critical acclaim, with many considering it to be a worthy successor to Breaking Bad, and received six nominations for the 67th Primetime Emmy Awards, including Outstanding Drama Series.

Cast and characters

Main
 Bob Odenkirk as Jimmy McGill, a struggling lawyer, who is looking after his brother Chuck. In the present, he manages a Cinnabon store in Omaha under the alias Gene Takavic.
 Jonathan Banks as Mike Ehrmantraut, a parking lot attendant who is also a criminal. 
 Rhea Seehorn as Kim Wexler, Jimmy's close friend and lover who is an attorney at Hamlin, Hamlin & McGill.
 Patrick Fabian as Howard Hamlin, Chuck's law partner at Hamlin, Hamlin & McGill, and Jimmy's rival.
 Michael Mando as Nacho Varga, a criminal associate of Tuco and a member of the Salamanca family's gang.
 Michael McKean as Chuck McGill, Jimmy's elder brother, a name partner at Hamlin, Hamlin & McGill who claims to suffer from electromagnetic hypersensitivity.

Recurring
 Jeremy Shamos  as Craig Kettleman, a county treasurer accused of embezzlement.
 Julie Ann Emery as Betsy Kettleman, Craig's wife, also accused of embezzlement.
 Kerry Condon as Stacey Ehrmantraut, Mike's widowed daughter-in-law and the mother of Kaylee Ehrmantraut.
 Faith Healey as Kaylee Ehrmantraut, Mike's granddaughter.
 Eileen Fogarty as Mrs. Nguyen, owner of a nail salon that houses Jimmy's law office (and home) in its back room.
 Peter Diseth as Bill Oakley, a deputy district attorney.
 Barry Shabaka Henley as Detective Greg Sanders, a Philadelphia cop who was formerly partnered with Mike on the force.
 Omid Abtahi as Detective Geoff Abbasi, a Philadelphia cop and Sanders' partner.
 Joe DeRosa as Dr. Caldera, a veterinarian who serves as Mike Ehrmantraut's liaison to the criminal underworld.
 Dennis Boutsikaris as Rich Schweikart, the attorney for Sandpiper Crossing
 Brandon K. Hampton as Ernesto, Chuck's assistant who works at Hamlin, Hamlin & McGill.
 Steven Levine and Daniel Spenser Levine as Lars and Cal Lindholm, twin skateboarders and small-time scam artists.
 Mel Rodriguez as Marco Pasternak, Jimmy's best friend and partner-in-crime in Cicero, Illinois.
 Jean Effron as Irene Landry, an elderly client of Jimmy McGill overcharged by Sandpiper Crossing

Guest stars
 Raymond Cruz as Tuco Salamanca, a ruthless, psychotic drug distributor in the South Valley who works with Nacho Varga.
 Míriam Colón as Abuelita Salamanca, Tuco's grandmother and Hector's mother.
 Cesar García as No-Doze, Tuco's henchman.
 Jesús Payán Jr. as Gonzo, Tuco's henchman.
 Josh Fadem as Joey Dixon, a film student that helps Jimmy film various projects.
 Julian Bonfiglio as Sound Guy, a film student that helps Jimmy film various projects.
 Mark Proksch as Daniel "Pryce" Wormald, a small-time drug dealer who hires Mike as security.
 Steven Ogg as Sobchak, a criminal Pryce hires for security along with Mike.
 Clea DuVall as Dr. Cruz, a doctor who treats Chuck.

Production

Development

Better Call Saul is a spin-off of Breaking Bad, a crime drama television series created and produced by Vince Gilligan that aired on AMC from 2008 to 2013, consisting of five seasons. Gilligan and Peter Gould began planning a spin-off of Breaking Bad as early as 2009. While filming the Breaking Bad episode "Full Measure", Gilligan asked Bob Odenkirk, the actor of Saul Goodman, what he thought of a spinoff of the show. In July 2012, Gilligan hinted at a possible Goodman spinoff, stating that he liked "the idea of a lawyer show in which the main lawyer will do anything it takes to stay out of a court of law", including settling on the courthouse steps. During his appearance on Talking Bad, Odenkirk noted that Saul was one of the most popular characters on the show, speculating that the audience likes the character because he is "the program's least hypocritical figure", and "is good at his job".

By July 2013, the series had yet to be greenlit. Netflix was one of many interested distributors, but ultimately a deal was made between AMC and Breaking Bad production company Sony Pictures Television. Gilligan and Gould serve as co-showrunners and Gilligan directed the first episode. Former Breaking Bad writers Thomas Schnauz and Gennifer Hutchison joined the writing staff, with Schnauz serving as co-executive producer and Hutchison as supervising producer. Also on the writing staff are Bradley Paul, and Gordon Smith, who worked on Breaking Bad as a writer's assistant.

Casting
Bob Odenkirk stars as lawyer/con-man Jimmy McGill (originally known as Saul Goodman in Breaking Bad). In January 2014, it was announced that Jonathan Banks would reprise his Breaking Bad role as Mike Ehrmantraut and be a series regular.

Dean Norris, who played Hank Schrader in Breaking Bad, announced that he would not make an appearance, partly due to his involvement in the CBS series Under the Dome. Anna Gunn, who played Skyler White, also mentioned a "talk" with Gilligan over possible guest appearances. 

Michael McKean was cast as McGill's elder brother Chuck. McKean had previously worked for Vince Gilligan as the recurring character Morris Fletcher first shown in The X-Files episode "Dreamland", and the two had kept in touch since about potential projects, though during that time, much of McKean's work was in New York City for Broadway theatre while Gilligan was in Los Angeles for television and could not work anything out. When Gilligan had contacted McKean about acting in Better Call Saul, McKean accepted the role just knowing the bare minimum on Chuck's electromagnetic sensitivity, having been both a fan of Breaking Bad and trusting Gilligan. When filming of Better Call Saul started in 2014, McKean had to initially split his time between that and performing in All the Way, a Broadway play that coincidentally also starred Bryan Cranston, who had played Walter White from Breaking Bad. When McKean's casting had been announced in April 2014, he had been deliberately misnamed to play a character called "Dr. Thurber", which McKean says was based on humorist James Thurber. Chuck's real name – Charles Lindbergh McGill – was inspired by the aviator Charles Lindbergh.

In May 2014, Patrick Fabian was cast in Better Call Saul, with E! Online describing his character as a "Kennedy-esque lawyer who's winning at life". Though initially reported as Burt, the character's name was later revealed as Howard Hamlin. Rhea Seehorn auditioned and got the role of Kim Wexler in April 2014, about two months before the first episode was shot. According to casting director Sharon Bialy, they had used two fake scenes to keep the high-profile project a secret, and when Seehorn auditioned and impressed them with both scenes, only then did they go to the next step and explain the audition's true purpose. Seehorn was able to adapt to this change to the role of Kim in a single take. Michael Mando was initially cast as Eddie, described by E! Online as a "smart and calculating criminal". Mando said that he had been approached through his agent from Better Call Saul casting directors about being in the show. After sending in an audition tape, he was flown to Los Angeles to meet with showrunners Vince Gilligan and Peter Gould and perform a screen test. For Mando, he said it was "love at first sight" in working with the pair in how well they provided direction and feedback and was notified about getting the part a few weeks later. The character was first mentioned in the Breaking Bad episode "Better Call Saul". 

In October 2014, Kerry Condon was cast as Stacey Ehrmantraut, Mike's widowed daughter-in-law. In November 2014, it was announced that Julie Ann Emery and Jeremy Shamos had been cast as Betsy and Craig Kettleman, described as "the world's squarest outlaws."

Filming 
Like its predecessor, Better Call Saul is set and filmed in Albuquerque, New Mexico. As filming began on June 2, 2014, Gilligan told The Hollywood Reporter that he was skeptical about the show's success, revealing production was almost two weeks behind schedule for the first season.

In the first scene from the first episode, Saul (now hiding his real identity under the Gene Takavic alias), is working at a Nebraska Cinnabon. This scene in the premiere is set in Omaha, but it was filmed in Albuquerque, New Mexico, at the Cottonwood Mall.

In December 2020, Odenkirk said that filming the first season had a negative impact on his health as he had to be in almost every scene, with little time to memorize his lines and even less to remember them, which proved overwhelming for him.

Episodes

International broadcasting
In December 2013, Netflix announced that the entire first season would be available for streaming in the United States and Canada after the airing of the first-season finale, and in Latin America and Europe each episode will be available a few days after the episode airs in the U.S. In Australia, Better Call Saul premiered on the streaming service Stan on February 9, 2015, acting as the service's flagship program. In the United Kingdom and the Republic of Ireland, the series was acquired by Netflix on December 16, 2013 and the first episode premiered on February 9, 2015, with the second episode scheduled for release the following day. Every subsequent episode was uploaded each week thereafter.

Reception

Critical response

Better Call Saul exceeded critics expectations, earning critical acclaim, with many critics calling it a worthy successor to Breaking Bad. On Rotten Tomatoes, the first season has a rating of 97%, based on 291 reviews, with an average rating of 8.10/10. The site's critical consensus reads, "Better Call Saul is a quirky, dark character study that manages to stand on its own without being overshadowed by the series that spawned it." On the review aggregator website Metacritic, the first season has a score of 78 out of 100, based on 43 critics, indicating "generally favorable reviews".

In his review of the two-episode premiere, Hank Stuever of The Washington Post graded it a "B+" and wrote the series "is right in line with the tone and style of the original, now-classic series", and that it "raises more questions in two hours than it will readily answer". Stephen Marche of Esquire wrote that the first few episodes were better than those of Breaking Bad. Kirsten Acuna of Business Insider declared the initial episodes "everything you could possibly want from a spinoff television series". Alessandra Stanley of The New York Times wrote, "Better Call Saul is better than good: It's delightful – in a brutal, darkly comic way, of course." Vulture writer Eric Konigsberg noted the show was special as it was "the first spinoff of this golden age of premium cable." Brian Tallerico of RogerEbert.com gave the first season a positive review, saying, "Better Call Saul is not only a great show in the context of the program that birthed it into existence, but would be a great show with or without Walter White."

The episode "Five-O" received near universal acclaim, with unanimous praise for Jonathan Banks' performance, with some critics considering it award-worthy. Roth Cornet of IGN gave it a score of 9.7 out of 10, praising the performance of Banks, the episode's pacing and interwoven storylines, as well as the final scene of the episode. She concluded, "Better Call Saul continues to deliver some of the best of what television has to offer as both those familiar with Breaking Bad and new viewers alike were given a shattering look at Mike's tragic past." Tim Surette of TV.com also highly praised the performance of Banks, and wrote that it was worthy of an Emmy, calling it "one of the best episodes to date of 2015's best new show to date". The episode received three Primetime Emmy Award nominations. Banks was nominated for the Outstanding Supporting Actor in a Drama Series, Gordon Smith was nominated for Outstanding Writing for a Drama Series, and Kelley Dixon was nominated for Outstanding Single-Camera Picture Editing for a Drama Series. When Peter Dinklage won for Outstanding Supporting Actor, he praised the other nominees, and singled out Banks by name.

Critics' top ten list

Ratings
The series premiere, "Uno" became the biggest in cable history, drawing in 4.4 million and 4 million in the 18–49 and 25–54 demographics, respectively, and received an overall viewership of 6.88 million.

 Live +7 ratings were not available, so Live +3 ratings have been used instead.

Accolades

Home media
The first season was released on Blu-ray and DVD in Region 1 on November 10, 2015. The set contains all 10 episodes, plus audio commentaries for every episode, uncensored episodes, deleted scenes, gag reel, and several behind-the-scenes featurettes. A limited edition Blu-ray set was also released with 3D packaging and a postcard vinyl of the Better Call Saul theme song by Junior Brown.

Related media

Better Call Saul: Client Development
AMC released a digital comic book for Better Call Saul titled Better Call Saul: Client Development in February 2015, in advance of the series premiere, which details the history of Saul and Mike, acting as a spin-off of the Breaking Bad episode  "Better Call Saul" that introduced Saul. This would later be retconned by the Better Call Saul episode "Breaking Bad".

References

External links
  – official site
 
 

2015 American television seasons
Season 1
Television series set in 2002